Super Stooges vs. the Wonder Women is a 1974 comedy film directed by Alfonso Brescia.

Cast
 Aldo Canti as Aru/Dharma II
 Marc Hannibal as Moog
 Hua Yueh as Chung
 Malisa Longo as Mila
 Aldo Bufi Landi as Dharma I
 Genie Woods as Beghira, Queen of the Amazons
 Riccardo Pizzuti as Philones
 Karen Yeh as May May Wong

Production
Super Stooges vs. the Wonder Women was the second film co-production between Ovidio Assonitis and Giorgio Carlo Rossi's Italian production company A Erre Cinematografica and the Hong Kong Shaw Brothers studio after Supermen Against the Orient. The film was influenced by Terence Young's film The Amazons which Assonitis had previously developed a derivative film of in 1973 titled Battle of the Amazons directed by Alfonso Brescia. Among the cast was Harlem Globetrotter Marc Hannibal and Shaw Brothers actor Hua Yueh.

The films credit the screenwriters as Alfonso Brescia and Aldo Crudo, but Assonitis claims that the script was actually written by Brescia and Bruno Corbucci. The film's story contains elements of the Three Fantastic Supermen Italian film series.

Release
Super Stooges vs. the Wonder Women was released in Italy in 1974. Italian film critic and historian Roberto Curti described the film's box office as performing "modestly" in Italy. The film was picked up for release in the United States by American International Pictures where it often played on a double bill with Madhouse.

The film has been released under a variety of titles in English. These include Barbarian Revenge, Return of the Barbarian Women, Amazons and Supermen, Amazons Against Superman and has been released on DVD in the United States as Amazons vs. Supermen by the Rarescope label.

Reception
TV Guide gave the film one star out of five, stating that after watching this film, you would "beg for The Three Stooges Meet Hercules, who conk each other on the noggin a heck of a lot better than these pseudo-stooges."

See also
 List of Hong Kong films of 1974
 List of Italian films of 1974

References

Footnotes

Sources

External links 
 

1974 comedy films
1974 films
Films directed by Alfonso Brescia
Hong Kong comedy films
Italian comedy films
Shaw Brothers Studio films
1970s superhero films
Superhero comedy films
Films scored by Franco Micalizzi
1970s Italian-language films
1970s Italian films
1970s Hong Kong films